Haplocochlias loperi is a species of sea snail, a marine gastropod mollusc in the family Skeneidae.

Description

Distribution
This marine species occurs off Guadeloupe.

References

 Rubio F., Fernández-Garcés R. & Rolán E. 2013. The genus Haplocochlias (Gastropoda, Skeneidae). Iberus, 31(2): 41–126 page(s): 76–81

External links

loperi
Gastropods described in 2013